, also known as , are members of transnational organized crime syndicates originating in Japan. The Japanese police and media, by request of the police, call them , while the yakuza call themselves . The English equivalent for the term yakuza is gangster, meaning an individual involved in a Mafia-like criminal organization. The yakuza are known for their strict codes of conduct, their organized fiefdom nature and several unconventional ritual practices such as yubitsume or amputation of the left little finger. Members are often portrayed as males with heavily-tattooed bodies and wearing fundoshi, sometimes with a kimono or, in more recent years, a Western-style "sharp" suit covering them. This group is still regarded as being among "the most sophisticated and wealthiest criminal organizations".
 	
At their height, the yakuza maintained a large presence in the Japanese media and they also operated internationally. At their peak in the early 1960s, police estimated that the yakuza had a membership of more than 200,000. However, this number has drastically dropped, a decline attributed to changing market opportunities and several legal and social developments in Japan which discourage the growth of yakuza membership. The yakuza still regularly engage in an array of criminal activities and many Japanese citizens still remain fearful of the threat these individuals pose to their safety. There remains no strict prohibition on yakuza membership in Japan today, although many pieces of legislation has been passed by the Japanese government aimed at impeding revenue and increasing liability for criminal activities.

Etymology 
The name yakuza originates from the traditional Japanese card game Oicho-Kabu, a game in which the goal is to draw three cards adding up to a score of 9. If the sum of the cards exceeds 10, its second digit is used as the score instead, and if the sum is exactly 10, the score is 0. If the three cards drawn are 8-9-3 (pronounced ya-ku-sa in Japanese), the sum is 20 and therefore the score is zero, making it the worst possible hand that can be drawn. In Japanese, the word yakuza is commonly written in katakana (ヤクザ).

Origins 

Despite uncertainty about the single origin of yakuza organizations, most modern yakuza derive from two social classifications which emerged in the mid-Edo period (1603–1868): tekiya, those who primarily peddled illicit, stolen or shoddy goods; and bakuto, those who were involved in or participated in gambling.

Tekiya (peddlers) ranked as one of the lowest social groups during the Edo period. As they began to form organizations of their own, they took over some administrative duties relating to commerce, such as stall allocation and protection of their commercial activities. During Shinto festivals, these peddlers opened stalls and some members were hired to act as security. Each peddler paid rent in exchange for a stall assignment and protection during the fair.

The tekiya were a highly structured and hierarchical group with the oyabun (boss) at the top and kobun (gang members) at the bottom. This hierarchy resembles a structure similar to the family – in traditional Japanese culture, the oyabun was often regarded as a surrogate father, and the kobun as surrogate children. During the Edo period, the government formally recognized the tekiya. At this time, within the tekiya, the oyabun were appointed as supervisors and granted near-samurai status, meaning they were allowed the dignity of a surname and two swords.

Bakuto (gamblers) had a much lower social standing even than traders, as gambling was illegal. Many small gambling houses cropped up in abandoned temples or shrines at the edges of towns and villages all over Japan.  Most of these gambling houses ran loan-sharking businesses for clients, and they usually maintained their own security personnel. Society at large regarded the gambling houses themselves, as well as the bakuto, with disdain. Much of the undesirable image of the Yakuza originates from bakuto; this includes the name Yakuza itself.

Because of the economic situation during the mid-Edo period and the predominance of the merchant class, developing Yakuza groups were composed of misfits and delinquents who had joined or formed the groups to extort customers in local markets by selling fake or shoddy goods.

Shimizu Jirocho (1820–1893) is Japan's most famous yakuza and folk hero. Shimizu's real name was Chogoro Yamamoto. His life and exploits were featured in sixteen films between 1911 and 1940.

The roots of the Yakuza survive today in initiation ceremonies, which incorporate tekiya or bakuto rituals. Although the modern Yakuza has diversified, some gangs still identify with one group or the other; for example, a gang whose primary source of income is illegal gambling may refer to themselves as bakuto.

Kyushu

Kyushu island has long been the largest source of yakuza members, including many renowned bosses in the Yamaguchi-gumi.  Isokichi Yoshida (1867–1936) from the Kitakyushu area was considered the first renowned modern yakuza. Recently Shinobu Tsukasa and Kunio Inoue, the bosses of the two most powerful clans in the Yamaguchi-gumi, originate from Kyushu. Fukuoka, the northernmost part of the island, has the largest number of designated syndicates among all of the prefectures.

Organization and activities

Structure 

The oyabun-kobun relationship is formalized by ceremonial sharing of sake from a single cup. This ritual is not exclusive to the Yakuza—it is also commonly performed in traditional Japanese Shinto weddings, and may have been a part of sworn brotherhood relationships.

During the World War II period in Japan, the more traditional tekiya/bakuto form of organization declined as the entire population was mobilised to participate in the war effort and society came under the control of the strict military government. However, after the war, the Yakuza adapted again.

Prospective Yakuza come from all walks of life. The most romantic tales tell how Yakuza accept sons who have been abandoned or exiled by their parents. Many Yakuza start out in junior high school or high school as common street thugs or members of bōsōzoku gangs.  Perhaps because of its lower socio-economic status, numerous Yakuza members come from Burakumin and ethnic Korean backgrounds. Low-ranking youth may be referred to as chimpira.

Yakuza groups are headed by an oyabun or  who gives orders to his subordinates, the kobun. In this respect, the organization is a variation of the traditional Japanese senpai-kōhai (senior-junior) model. Members of Yakuza gangs cut their family ties and transfer their loyalty to the gang boss. They refer to each other as family members—fathers and elder and younger brothers. The Yakuza is populated almost entirely by men and the very few women who are acknowledged are the wives of bosses, who are referred to by the title . When the 3rd Yamaguchi-gumi boss (Kazuo Taoka) died in the early 1980s, his wife (Fumiko) took over as boss of Yamaguchi-gumi, albeit for a short time.

Yakuza have a complex organizational structure. There is an overall boss of the syndicate, the kumicho, and directly beneath him are the saiko komon (senior advisor) and so-honbucho  (headquarters chief). The second in the chain of command is the wakagashira, who governs several gangs in a region with the help of a fuku-honbucho who is himself responsible for several gangs. The regional gangs themselves are governed by their local boss, the shateigashira.

Each member's connection is ranked by the hierarchy of sakazuki (sake sharing). Kumicho is at the top and controls various . The saikō-komon control their own turfs in different areas or cities. They have their own underlings, including other underbosses, advisors, accountants, and enforcers.

Those who have received sake from oyabun are part of the immediate family and ranked in terms of elder or younger brothers. However, each kobun, in turn, can offer sakazuki as oyabun to his underling to form an affiliated organization, which might in turn form lower-ranked organizations. In the Yamaguchi-gumi, which controls some 2,500 businesses and 500 Yakuza groups, there are fifth-rank subsidiary organizations.

Rituals 

Yubitsume, also referred to as otoshimae, or the cutting off of one's finger, is a form of penance or apology. Upon a first offence, the transgressor must cut off the tip of his left little finger and give the severed portion to his boss. Sometimes an underboss may do this in penance to the oyabun if he wants to spare a member of his own gang from further retaliation. This practice has started to wane amongst the younger members, due to it being an easy identifier for police.

Its origin stems from the traditional way of holding a Japanese sword. The bottom three fingers of each hand are used to grip the sword tightly, with the thumb and index fingers slightly loose. The removal of digits starting with the little finger and moving up the hand to the index finger progressively weakens a person's sword grip.

The idea is that a person with a weak sword grip then has to rely more on the group for protection—reducing individual action. In recent years, prosthetic fingertips have been developed to disguise this distinctive appearance.

Many Yakuza have full-body tattoos (including their genitalia). These tattoos, known as irezumi in Japan, are still often "hand-poked", that is, the ink is inserted beneath the skin using non-electrical, hand-made, and handheld tools with needles of sharpened bamboo or steel. The procedure is expensive, painful, and can take years to complete.

When Yakuza members play Oicho-Kabu cards with each other, they often remove their shirts or open them up and drape them around their waists. This enables them to display their full-body tattoos to each other. This is one of the few times that Yakuza members display their tattoos to others, as they normally keep them concealed in public with long-sleeved and high-necked shirts. When new members join, they are often required to remove their trousers as well and reveal any lower body tattoos.

Syndicates

Three largest syndicates
The Yakuza are still active in Japan. Although Yakuza membership has declined since the implementation of the Anti-Boryokudan Act in 1992, the Japanese National Police Agency estimated in 2021 that approximately 12,300 Yakuza members were engaged in illegal activity in Japan, and it is possible that the true number could be higher. 

The Yakuza does not consist of just one group, rather there are many different syndicate groups that together form one of the largest organized crime groups in the world.

Designated bōryokudan 

A  is a "particularly harmful" Yakuza group registered by the Prefectural Public Safety Commissions under the  enacted in 1991. Groups are designated as boryokudan if their members take advantage of the gang's influence to do business, are structured to have one leader, and have a large portion of their members hold criminal records.

Under the Organized Crime Countermeasures Law, the Prefectural Public Safety Commissions have registered 24 syndicates as the designated boryokudan groups. Fukuoka Prefecture has the largest number of designated boryokudan groups among all of the prefectures, at 5; the Kudo-kai, the Taishu-kai, the Fukuhaku-kai, the Dojin-kai, and the Namikawa-kai. After the Organized Crime Countermeasures Law was enacted, many Yakuza syndicates made efforts to restructure to appear more professional and legitimate.

Designated boryokudan groups are usually large organizations (mostly formed before World War II, some before the Meiji Restoration of the 19th century); however, there are some exceptions such as the Namikawa-kai, which, with its blatant armed conflicts with the Dojin-kai, was registered only two years after its formation.

Current activities

Japan 

Yakuza are regarded as semi-legitimate organizations. For example, immediately after the 1995 Kobe earthquake, the Yamaguchi-gumi yakuza group, who are based in the area, mobilized to provide disaster relief services (including the use of a helicopter). Media reports contrasted this rapid response with the much slower pace at which the Japanese government's official relief efforts took place. The Yakuza repeated their aid after the 2011 Tōhoku earthquake and tsunami, with groups opening their offices to refugees and sending dozens of trucks with supplies to affected areas (see below). For this reason, many Yakuza regard their income and hustle (shinogi) as a collection of a feudal tax.

The yakuza and its affiliated gangs control drug trafficking in Japan, especially methamphetamine. While many Yakuza syndicates, notably the Yamaguchi-gumi, officially forbid their members from engaging in drug trafficking, some other Yakuza syndicates, like the Dojin-kai, are heavily involved in it.

Some Yakuza groups are known to deal extensively in human trafficking. The Philippines is a source of young women. Yakuza trick girls from impoverished villages into coming to Japan by promising them respectable jobs with good wages. Instead, they are forced into becoming sex workers and strippers.

Yakuza frequently engage in a unique form of Japanese extortion known as sōkaiya. In essence, this is a specialized form of protection racket. Instead of harassing small businesses, the Yakuza harass a stockholders' meeting of a larger corporation. Yakuza operatives obtain the right to attend by making a small purchase of stock, and then at the meeting physically intimidate other stockholders.

Yakuza also have ties to the Japanese real estate market and banking sector through jiageya. Jiageya specializes in inducing holders of small real estate to sell their property so that estate companies can carry out much larger development plans. The Japanese bubble economy of the 1980s is often blamed on real estate speculation by banking subsidiaries. After the collapse of the property bubble, a manager of a major bank in Nagoya was assassinated, prompting much speculation about the banking industry's indirect connection to the Japanese underworld.

Yakuza have been known to make large investments in legitimate, mainstream companies. In 1989, Susumu Ishii, the Oyabun of the Inagawa-kai (a well-known Yakuza group) bought US$255 million worth of Tokyo Kyuko Electric Railway's stock. Japan's Securities and Exchange Surveillance Commission has knowledge of more than 50 listed companies with ties to organized crime, and in March 2008, the Osaka Securities Exchange decided to review all listed companies and expel those with Yakuza ties.

As a matter of principle, theft is not recognized as a legitimate activity of Yakuza. This is in line with the idea that their activities are semi-open; theft by definition would be a covert activity. More importantly, such an act would be considered a trespass by the community. Yakuza also usually do not conduct the actual business operation by themselves. Core business activities such as merchandising, loan sharking, or management of gambling houses are typically managed by non-Yakuza members who pay protection fees for their activities.

Numerous pieces of evidence tie Yakuza to international criminal activity. There are many tattooed Yakuza members imprisoned in various Asian prisons for drug trafficking, arms smuggling, and other crimes. In 1997, one verified Yakuza member was caught smuggling 4 kilograms (8.82 pounds) of heroin into Canada.

Because of their history as a legitimate feudal organization and their connection to the Japanese political system through the uyoku dantai (extreme right-wing political groups), Yakuza are somewhat a part of the Japanese establishment, with six fan magazines reporting on their activities. Yakuza involvement in politics functions similarly to that of a lobbying group, with them backing those who share in their opinions or beliefs. 

One study found that 1 in 10 adults under the age of 40 believed that the Yakuza should be allowed to exist.
 
In the 1980s in Fukuoka, a large conflict between the Yamaguchi-gumi and Dojin-kai groups known as the Yama-Michi War spiraled out of control, and civilians were hurt. The police response was to mediate and force the Yakuza bosses on both sides to publicly declare a truce.

At various times, people in Japanese cities have launched anti-Yakuza campaigns, with mixed success. In March 1995, the Japanese government passed the Act for Prevention of Unlawful Activities by Criminal Gang Members, which made traditional racketeering much more difficult. Beginning in 2009, led by agency chief Takaharu Ando, Japanese police began to crack down on the gangs. Kodo-kai chief Kiyoshi Takayama was arrested in late 2010. In December 2010, police arrested Yamaguchi-gumi's alleged number three leader, Tadashi Irie. According to the media, encouraged by tougher anti-Yakuza laws and legislation, local governments and construction companies have begun to shun or ban Yakuza activities or involvement in their communities or construction projects. Laws were enacted in Osaka and Tokyo in 2010 and 2011 to try to combat Yakuza influence by making it illegal for any business to do business with the Yakuza.

On August 24, 2021, Nomura Satoru became the first yakuza boss to be sentenced to death. Nomura was involved in one murder and assaults of three people. The presiding judge Adachi Ben of the Fukuoka District Court characterized the murders as extremely vicious attacks.

Yakuza's aid in Tōhoku catastrophe
Following the Tōhoku earthquake and tsunami on 11 March 2011, the Yakuza sent hundreds of trucks filled with food, water, blankets, and sanitary accessories to aid the people in the affected areas of the natural disaster. CNN México said that although the Yakuza operates through extortion and other violent methods, they "[moved] swiftly and quietly to provide aid to those most in need."

United States 
The presence of individuals affiliated with the Yakuza in the United States has increased tremendously since the 1960s, and although much of their activity is concentrated in Hawaii, they have made their presence known in other parts of the country, especially in Los Angeles and the San Francisco Bay Area, as well as Seattle, Las Vegas, Arizona, Virginia, Chicago, and New York City. The Yakuza are said to use Hawaii as a midway station between Japan and mainland America, smuggling methamphetamine into the country and smuggling firearms back to Japan.  They easily fit into the local population, since many tourists from Japan and other Asian countries visit the islands on a regular basis, and there is a large population of residents who are of full or partial Japanese descent. They also work with local gangs, funneling Japanese tourists to gambling parlors and brothels.

In California, the Yakuza have made alliances with local Korean gangs as well as Chinese triads. They allied with Vietnamese gangs to gain muscle, as these gangsters were known to be able to become extremely violent as needed. The Yakuza identified these gangs as useful partners due to the constant stream Vietnamese cafe shoot-outs and home invasion burglaries throughout the 1980s and early 1990s. In New York City, they appear to collect finder's fees from Russian, Irish and Italian gang members and businessmen for guiding Japanese tourists to gambling establishments, both legal and illegal.

Handguns manufactured in the US account for a large share (33%) of handguns seized in Japan, followed by handguns manufactured in China (16%) and in the Philippines (10%).  In 1990, a Smith & Wesson .38 caliber revolver that cost $275 in the US could sell for up to $4,000 in Tokyo.

The FBI suspects that the Yakuza use various operations to launder money in the US.

In 2001, the FBI's representative in Tokyo arranged for Tadamasa Goto, the head of the group Goto-gumi, to receive a liver transplant at the UCLA Medical Center in the United States, in return for information of Yamaguchi-gumi operations in the US.  This was done without prior consultation of the NPA. The journalist who uncovered the deal received threats from Goto and was given police protection in the US and in Japan.

Asia (outside Japan) 
The Yakuza have engaged in illegal activities in Southeast Asia since the 1960s; they are working there to develop sex tourism and drug trafficking. This is the area where they are still the most active today.

In addition to their presence in Southeast Asian countries such as Thailand, the Philippines, and Vietnam, Yakuza groups also operate in South Korea, China, Taiwan, and in the Pacific Islands (mainly Hawaii).

Yakuza groups also have a presence in North Korea; in 2009, Yakuza member Yoshiaki Sawada was released from a North Korean prison after spending five years there attempting to bribe a North Korean official and smuggle drugs.

Constituent members
According to a 2006 speech by Mitsuhiro Suganuma, a former officer of the Public Security Intelligence Agency, around 60 percent of Yakuza members come from burakumin, the descendants of a feudal outcast class and approximately 30 percent of them are Japanese-born Koreans, and only 10 percent are from non-burakumin Japanese and Chinese ethnic groups.

Burakumin 
The burakumin is a group that is socially discriminated against in Japanese society, whose recorded history goes back to the Heian period in the 11th century. The burakumin are descendants of outcast communities of the pre-modern, especially the feudal era, mainly those with occupations considered tainted with death or ritual impurity, such as butchers, executioners, undertakers, or leather workers. They traditionally lived in their own secluded hamlets and villages away from other groups.

According to David E. Kaplan and Alec Dubro, burakumin account for about 70% of the members of Yamaguchi-gumi, the largest Yakuza syndicate in Japan.

Ethnic Koreans 
While ethnic Koreans make up only 0.5% of the Japanese population, they are a prominent part of Yakuza because they suffer discrimination in Japanese society along with the burakumin. In the early 1990s, 18 of 90 top bosses of Inagawa-kai were ethnic Koreans. The Japanese National Police Agency suggested Koreans composed 10% of the Yakuza proper and 70% of burakumin in the Yamaguchi-gumi. Some of the representatives of the designated Bōryokudan are also Koreans. The Korean significance had been an untouchable taboo in Japan and one of the reasons that the Japanese version of Kaplan and Dubro's Yakuza (1986) had not been published until 1991 with the deletion of Korean-related descriptions of the Yamaguchi-gumi.

Japanese-born people of Korean ancestry who retain South Korean nationality are considered resident aliens and are embraced by the Yakuza precisely because they fit the group's "outsider" image.

Notable Yakuza members of Korean ancestry include Hisayuki Machii the founder of the Tosei-kai, Tokutaro Takayama the head of the 4th-generation Aizukotetsu-kai, Jiro Kiyota (1940 -) the head of the 5th-generation Inagawa-kai, Shinichi Matsuyama (1927 -) the head of the 5th-generation Kyokuto-kai and Hirofumi Hashimoto (1947 -) the founder of the Kyokushinrengo-kai (affiliated with Yamaguchi-gumi, dissolved in 2019).

Indirect enforcement
Since 2011, regulations outlawing business with Yakuza members, government-ordered audits of Yakuza finances, and the enactment of Yakuza exclusion ordinances have hastened a decline in Yakuza membership. The Financial Services Agency ordered Mizuho Financial Group, Inc. to improve compliance and that its top executives report by 28 October 2013 what they knew and when about a consumer-credit affiliate found making loans to crime groups.

On top of the already staggering anti-Yakuza legislation, Japan’s younger generation may be less inclined to gang-related activity, as modern society has made it easier especially for young men to gain even semi-legitimate jobs such as ownership in bars and massage parlors and pornography that can be more profitable than gang affiliation all while protecting themselves by abiding with the strict anti-Yakuza laws.

Citizens who take a stronger stance, however, seem to also have taken action that does not lead to violent reactions from the Yakuza. In Kyushu, although store owners initially were attacked by gang members, the region has reached stability after local business owners banned known Yakuza members and posted warnings against Yakuza entering their respective premises.

Additional regulations can be found in a 2008 anti-Yakuza amendment which allows prosecutors to place the blame on any Yakuza-related crime on crime bosses. Specifically, the leader of the Yamaguchi-gumi has since been incarcerated and forced to pay upwards of 85 million yen in damages of several crimes committed by his gangsters, leading to the Yakuza’s dismissal of around 2,000 members per year; albeit, some analysts claim that these dismissals are part of the Yakuza’s collective attempt to regain a better reputation amongst the populace. Regardless, the Yakuza’s culture, too, has shifted towards a more secretive and far less public approach to crime, as many of their traditions have been reduced or erased to avoid being identified as Yakuza.

Yakuza organizations also face pressure from the US government; in 2011, a federal executive order required financial institutions to freeze Yakuza assets, and as of 2013, the U.S. Treasury Department had frozen about US$55,000 of Yakuza holdings, including two Japan-issued American Express cards.

Legacy

Yakuza in society 
The Yakuza has had mixed relations with Japanese society. Despite their pariah status, some of their actions may be perceived to have positive effects on society. For example, they stop other criminal organizations from acting in their areas of operation. They have been known to provide relief in times of disaster. These actions have at times painted Yakuza in a fairly positive light within Japan. The Yakuza also attracts membership from  traditionally scorned minority groups, such as the Korean-Japanese. However, gang wars and the use of violence as a tool have caused their approval to fall with the general public.

Film 

The Yakuza have been in media and culture in many different fashions. Creating its own genre of movies within Japan's film industry, the portrayal of the Yakuza mainly manifests in one of two archetypes; they are portrayed as either honorable and respectable men or as criminals who use fear and violence as their means of operation. Movies like Battles Without Honor and Humanity and Dead or Alive portray some of the members as violent criminals, with the focus being on the violence, while other movies focus more on the "business" side of the Yakuza.

The 1992 film Minbo, a satirical view of Yakuza activities, resulted in retaliation against the director, as real-life Yakuza gangsters attacked the director Juzo Itami shortly after the release of the film.

Yakuza films have also been popular in the Western market with films such as the 1975 film The Yakuza, the 1989 film Black Rain, the 2005 film Into the Sun, 2013’s  The Wolverine, 2018 film The Outsider, and Snake Eyes in 2021.

Television

The Yakuza feature prominently in the 2015 American dystopian series The Man in the High Castle. They are also the basis for the 2019 BBC TV Series Giri/Haji, which features a character whose life is put in danger after he comes under suspicion for a murder tied to the Yakuza. The 2022 HBO Max series Tokyo Vice explores the dealings of the Yakuza from the perspective of an American reporter Jake Adelstein.

Video games 
The video game series Like A Dragon, formerly known as Yakuza, launched in 2005, portrays the actions of several different ranking members of the Yakuza, as well as criminal associates such as dirty cops and loan sharks. The series addresses some of the same themes as the Yakuza genre of film does, like violence, honor, politics of the syndicates, and the social status of the Yakuza in Japan. The series has been successful, spawning sequels, spin-offs, a live-action movie and a web TV series.

Grand Theft Auto III features a Yakuza clan that assists the protagonist in the second and third act after they cut their ties with the Mafia. The Yakuza derive most of their income from a casino, Kenji's, and are currently fighting to keep other gangs from peddling drugs in their territory while seeking to protect their activities from police interference. Towards the end of the third act, the player assassinates the leader of the clan, and the other members are later executed by Colombian gangsters. In Grand Theft Auto III prequel, Grand Theft Auto: Liberty City Stories, the Yakuza play a major role in the storyline. In Grand Theft Auto: Vice City, the Yakuza is mentioned, presumably operating in Vice City.

Hitman 2: Silent Assassin features a mission set in Japan that sees Agent 47 assassinating the son of a wealthy arms dealer during his dinner meeting with a Yakuza boss at his private estate. A mission in the 2016 game, Hitman, set at a secluded mountaintop hospital, features a notorious Yakuza lawyer and fixer as one of two targets to be assassinated.

Manga, anime and drama 
 Stop!! Hibari-kun!: manga (1981–1983), anime (1983–1984). The story focuses on Kōsaku Sakamoto, a high school student who goes to live with yakuza boss Ibari Ōzora and his four children—Tsugumi, Tsubame, Hibari and Suzume—after the death of his mother. Kōsaku is shocked to learn that Hibari, who looks and behaves as a girl, is male.
 Gokusen: manga (2000), drama (2002, 2005 and 2008) and anime (2004). The heiress of a clan becomes a teacher in a difficult high school and is assigned a class of delinquents, the 3-D. She will teach them mathematics, while gradually getting involved in several other levels, going so far as to get her students out of a bad situation by sometimes using her skills as heir to the clan.
 My Boss My Hero: Film stock (2001), drama (2002). A young gang leader, who seems to be too stupid to do his job, misses a big deal because he can't count correctly, and on the other hand, is practically illiterate. In order to access the succession of the clan, his father then forces him to return to high school, to obtain his diploma. He must not reveal his membership in the yakuza, under penalty of being immediately excluded.
 Twittering Birds Never Fly: manga of the shōnen-ai genre (2011–?). Yashiro, a totally depraved masochist, boss of a yakuza clan and the Shinsei finance company, hires Chikara Dômeki, a secretive and not very talkative man, as his bodyguard. While Yashiro would like to take advantage of Dômeki's body, the latter is helpless.
 Like the Beast: manga, yaoi (2008). Tomoharu Ueda, a police officer in a small local post, meets Aki Gotôda, son of the leader of a Yakuza clan, in pursuit of an underwear thief. The next morning, Aki shows up at his house to thank him for his help and finds himself making a declaration of love for him. Taken aback, Ueda replies that it is better that they get to know each other, but that's without counting Aki's stubbornness, ready to do anything to achieve his ends.
 Odd Taxi: anime, manga (2021). A taxi driver becomes entangled in the rivalry of competing kobun and uses his position to undermine the local yakuza organization.

Several manga by Ryoichi Ikegami are located in the middle of the Japanese underworld:
 Sanctuary (1990): Hôjô and Asami, childhood friends, have only one goal: to give the Japanese back a taste of life, and to shake up the country. For this, they decide to climb the ladder of power, one in the light, as a politician, the other in the shadows, as yakuza.
 Heat (1999): Tatsumi Karasawa is the owner of a club in Tokyo who plans to expand his business. He gives a hard time not only to the police but also to the yakuza, of which he manages, however, to rally a certain number at his side.
 Nisekoi (2014): Nisekoi follows high school students Raku Ichijo, the son of a leader in the Yakuza faction Shuei-gumi, and Chitoge Kirisaki, the daughter of a boss in a rival gang known as Muchi-Konkai.

Yakuza-related terminology

See also 

 Bōsōzoku
 Camorra
 Crime in Japan
 Criminal tattoo
 Gopnik
 Irezumi
 Irish mob
 Kkangpae (Korean mafia)
 List of criminal enterprises, gangs and syndicates
 Ndrangheta
 Organized crime
 Punch perm
 Russian mafia
 Sicilian Mafia
 American Mafia
 Triads (Chinese mafia)
 Yakuza exclusion ordinances
 Yakuza members

References

Bibliography

 Bruno, A. (2007). "The Yakuza, the Japanese Mafia" CrimeLibrary: Time Warner
 Blancke, Stephan. ed. (2015). East Asian Intelligence and Organised Crime. China – Japan – North Korea – South Korea – Mongolia Berlin: Verlag Dr. Köster
 Kaplan, David, Dubro Alec. (1986). Yakuza Addison-Wesley
 Kaplan, David, Dubro Alec. (2003). Yakuza: Expanded Edition University of California Press
 Hill, Peter B.E. (2003). The Japanese Mafia: Yakuza, Law, and the State Oxford University Press
 Johnson, David T. (2001). The Japanese Way of Justice: Prosecuting Crime in Japan Oxford University Press
 Miyazaki, Manabu. (2005) Toppamono: Outlaw. Radical. Suspect. My Life in Japan's Underworld Kotan Publishing
 Seymour, Christopher. (1996). Yakuza Diary Atlantic Monthly Press
 Saga, Junichi., Bester, John. (1991) Confessions of a Yakuza: A Life in Japan's Underworld Kodansha America
 Schilling, Mark. (2003). The Yakuza Movie Book Stone Bridge Press
 Sterling, Claire. (1994). Thieves' World Simon & Schuster
 Sho Fumimura (Writer), Ryoichi Ikegami (Artist). (Series 1993–1997) "Sanctuary" Viz Communications Inc (Vol 2:;;;;;;;)
 Tendo, Shoko (2007). Yakuza Moon: Memoirs of a Gangster's Daughter Kodansha International 
 Young Yakuza. Dir. Jean-Pierre Limosin. Cinema Epoch, 2007.

External links

 The secret lives of Yakuza womenBBC Reel (Video)
 101 East – Battling the YakuzaAl Jazeera (Video)
 FBI What We Investigate – Asian Transnational Organized Crime Groups
 Yakuza Portal site
 Blood ties: Yakuza daughter lifts lid on hidden hell of gangsters' families
 Crime Library: Yakuza
 Japanese Mayor Shot Dead; CBS News, 17 April 2007
 Yakuza: The Japanese Mafia
 Yakuza: Kind-hearted criminals or monsters in suits?

 
17th-century establishments in Japan
Organizations established in the 17th century
Japanese secret societies
Secret societies related to organized crime
Criminal subcultures
Japanese subcultures
Japanese culture
Organized crime by ethnic or national origin
Transnational organized crime
Organized crime groups in Japan
Organized crime groups in the United States
Gangs in Hawaii
Gangs in Los Angeles
Gangs in New York City
Gangs in San Francisco
Anti-communist organizations in Japan